Raj Engineering College situated in Jodhpur is running by Manav Kalyan & Vikas Shikshan Sansthan. The college is now affiliated to Bikaner Technical University and approved by All India Council for Technical Education. The college offers education in the field of Engineering.

Academics

Integrated first degree

College offers four-year programmes in Bachelor of Engineering in the following fields:

 Civil Engineering
 Electrical Engineering
 Mechanical Engineering
 Computer Science
 Electronics and Communication Engineering
 Information Technology
 Mining Engineering
 Automobile Engineering

See also
 List of universities and higher education colleges in Jodhpur
 Rajasthan Technical University
 Jodhpur National University

References

Engineering colleges in Jodhpur
Colleges in Jodhpur